Branco River (engl. White River) is a river of Acre state in western Brazil. The capital of Acre, Rio Branco, is on this river. The river flows into the Acre River.

See also
 List of rivers of Acre

References
 Brazilian Ministry of Transport

Rivers of Acre (state)
Rio Branco, Acre

it:Rio Branco (disambigua)#Fiumi